Moio della Civitella is a town and comune in the province of Salerno in the Campania region of south-western Italy.

Geography
Located in the middle of Cilento, Moio borders with the municipalities of Campora, Cannalonga, Gioi, and Vallo della Lucania. It counts a single hamlet (frazione), that is the nearby village of Pellare. The nearest towns and villages are Vallo della Lucania (3,5 km), Cannalonga (4 km), Angellara (2,5 km), and Cardile (5 km).

See also
Cilentan dialect
Cilento and Vallo di Diano National Park

References

External links

Cities and towns in Campania
Localities of Cilento